The 2002 end-of-year tests, also known as the 2002 Autumn Internationals, are international rugby union matches that took place during November and December 2002. The matches were contested between touring teams from the southern hemisphere, namely Australia, Argentina, New Zealand, and South Africa and teams from the Six Nations Championship - England, France, Ireland, Italy, Scotland and Wales. Some matches also featured second-tier European sides Romania, Russia and Georgia, and South Pacific nation Fiji.

The 2002 end-of-year tests featured one of the biggest results in rugby union history, as South Africa suffered their heaviest ever defeat, losing 53-3 to England on 23 November. This result saw England record back-to-back wins against New Zealand, Australia and South Africa in consecutive weeks - the only occasion in rugby history that any nation has achieved this feat.

Fixtures

Week 1

Week 2

Week 3

Week 4

Jannes Labuschagne (South Africa) was shown a red card after 22 minutes.
This was South Africa's biggest defeat in their history until a 57–0 defeat to New Zealand in September 2017.

See also
 End of year rugby union tests
 Mid-year rugby union tests

References

2000
2002–03 in European rugby union
2002 in Oceanian rugby union
2002 in North American rugby union
2002 in South American rugby union
2002 in South African rugby union